Hafez Awards is an annual awards ceremony which is held honoring cinematic achievements in Iranian cinema. The awards, first presented in 1997, are presented by Picture World Magazine (Aka. Donyaye Tassvir in Persian) which makes it to be known also as Donyaye Tassvir Awards. It's the only non-governmental ceremony among the cinematic festivals and awards held in Iran. Mehran Modiri and Asghar Farhadi jointly with 9 statues of Hafez are the record holders of this award.

20th Hafez Awards Held Online during Covid-19 pandemic.

Background
Ali Moallem, Picture World founder and previous editor, established the awards in mid-'90s when Iranian cinema was under heavy governmental dominance. Watching Iranian cinema developing presence and success in international film festivals, he thought over creating an independent film award in order to honor filmmakers without political considerations and also to make a connection between film stars and the people. First ceremony was held in 1997 under the title "Hafez" after Iranian great poet Khwāja Shams-ud-Dīn Muḥammad Ḥāfeẓ-e Shīrāzi. The award is a typographical statue resembling Persian written form of the word "Hafez". as of 2016, sixteen Hafez Awards ceremonies has been held through the years.

Categories 

Awards are a set of 24 statues and a medal as follows:

Motion picture awards 

 Best Motion Picture
 Best Director – Motion Picture
 Best Actor – Motion Picture (2 awards)
 Best Actress– Motion Picture (2 awards)
 Best Screenplay – Motion Picture (both original and adapted)
 Best Cinematography – Motion Picture
 Best Original Score – Motion Picture
 Best Original Song – Motion Picture and Television Series
 Best Editor – Motion Picture
 Best Documentary – Motion Picture
 Best Technical-Artistic Achievement
Best Special Individual Achievement
 Abbas Kiarostami Memorial Medal (since 2016)
 Lifetime Achievement Award
 Cinematic Literature Achievement Award
 Jury Prize
 Best Stuntman (since 2021)

Television awards 

 Best Television Series
 Best Director – Television Series
 Best Screenplay – Television Series
 Best Actor – Television Series Comedy
 Best Actress – Television Series Comedy
 Best Actor – Television Series Drama
 Best Actress – Television Series Drama
 Best Television Figure

Winners are chosen by a 9-membered jury including Picture World writers and critics. The nominees are selected from the movies and TV series which are screened in a single Iranian year (21 March-20 March).

References

External links
Hafez Awards Official Website

Iranian film awards
1997 establishments in Iran